Rostov-Don is a female handball team from Rostov-on-Don, Russia. Established in 1965, the club was called Rostselmash until 2002. Rostov-Don is competing in the Russian Super League. They have won the league seven times, in 1994, 2015, 2017, 2018, 2019, 2020, and 2022.

The club have won the Women's EHF Cup in 2016–17, and was runner-up of the 2014–15 edition after losing the finals against the Danish team TTH Holstebro.

In the 2017–18 EHF Champions League, the club reached the Final 4 tournament for the first time in the club's history, where they finished fourth. The following year, they reached the Final 4 once again. This time they made it to the final, losing to Győri Audi ETO.

Achievements

Russia
Russian Super League 
Winners: 1994, 2015, 2017, 2018, 2019, 2020, 2022
Runners-up: 1993, 1995, 2011, 2012, 2013, 2016, 2021
Third place: 1996, 1997, 2001, 2002, 2003, 2004, 2005, 2010, 2014
Russian Cup 
Winners: 2007, 2008, 2012, 2013, 2015, 2016, 2017, 2018, 2019, 2020, 2021
Runners-up: 2010, 2011, 2022
Russian Supercup 
Winners: 2015, 2016, 2017, 2018, 2019, 2020

Soviet Union
Soviet Handball Championship
Winners: 1990, 1991
Runners-up: 1979, 1980, 1981, 1982, 1989
Third place: 1976, 1988
Soviet Union National Cup
Winners: 1980, 1982

European competitions
EHF Champions League
Runners-up: 2018–19
Fourth place: 2017–18
Women's EHF Cup
Winners: 2016–17 
Runners-up: 2014–15
EHF Cup Winners' Cup
Winners: 1990

Other tournaments
Baia Mare Champions Trophy
Fourth place: 2014
Bucharest Trophy
Fourth place: 2014, 2015

European record

All results (home and away) list Rostov-Don's goal tally first.

Arena

Name: Rostov-on-Don Palace of Sports
City: Rostov-on-Don, Russia
Capacity: 3,000 spectators

Team

Current squad
Squad for the 2021–22 season

Goalkeepers
 1  Galina Gabisova
 11  Anastasia Lagina
 16  Daria Tkacheva
 28  Victoriya Kalinina
RW
 6  Yulia Managarova (c)
 15  Ekaterina Levsha
LW
 22  Aleksandra Smirnova
 63  Kristina Kozhokar
 88  Polina Kuznetsova
Line players
 19  Ksenia Makeeva

Back players
LB
 8  Anna Sen
 17  Vladlena Bobrovnikova

CB
 25  Yaroslava Frolova
 51  Milana Tazhenova
RB
 13  Anna Vyakhireva
 76  Ekaterina Zelenkova

Staff members
Staff for the 2021–22 season
  Interim Head Coach: Tomáš Hlavatý
  Team Leader: Arthur Sazonov
  Senior coach: Tatyana Bereznyak

Individual awards in the EHF Champions League

Head coach history 
 Sergey Belitsky (2002–2006)
 Olga Karpenko (2006–2007)
 Mikhail Aksenov (2007–2009)
 Sergey Belitsky (2009–2014)
 Jan Leslie (2014–2016)
 Frédéric Bougeant (2016–2018)
 Ambros Martin (2018–2020)
 Per Johansson (2020–2022)
 Tomáš Hlavatý (2022) (interim)
 Eduard Koksharov (2022–present)

References

External links

Official club website (in Russian)

Russian handball clubs
Sport in Rostov-on-Don